François Jourda de Vaux de Foletier, also called François de Vaux de Foletier, (22 June 1893 – 17 February 1988) was a 20th-century French archivist and historian, a specialist of the history of the Romani people in Europe.

Biography 
 
In 1955, he was among the founders of the journal .

He was awarded several prizes by the Académie française in 1931, 1961, 1970 and 1981.

 dedicated him her book Les Tsiganes — une destinée européenne, the 218th title published in 1994 by the  Éditions Gallimard in the series "Découvertes Gallimard, Histoire", .

Works 
1923: La Rochelle d’autrefois et d’à présent, La Rochelle, Pijollet
1925: Galiot de Genouillac, maître de l’artillerie de France (1465-1546), Paris, A. Picard
1929: Histoire d’Aunis et de Saintonge, Paris, Boivin, series "Vieilles provinces de France"
1931: Le Siège de la Rochelle, Paris, Firmin-Didot, Prix Thérouanne of the Académie française ; new edition, La Rochelle, éditions Quartier Latin et Rupella, 1978
1932: Images de la Rochelle, ill. by Louis Suire, La Rochelle, La Rose des vents
1937: Le Comte de Buenos-Aires, in collaboration with Max Dorian, Paris, Gallimard
1938: Brouage, ville morte, ill. by Louis Suire, La Rochelle, La Rose des vents
1953: Étude sur les recherches biographiques aux archives de la Seine, in Jacques Meurgey de Tupigny, Guide des recherches généalogiques aux Archives nationales, Paris, Imprimerie nationale
1957: Charentes, Paris, Hachette, series "Les Albums des Guides bleus"
1960: Poitou, Paris, Hachette, series "Les Albums des Guides bleus"
1960: Arches de Paris, ill. de Louis Suire, La Rochelle, La Rose des vents
1961: Les Tsiganes dans l'ancienne France, Paris, société d’édition géographique et touristique, series "Connaissance du monde", Prix Broquette-Gonin of the Académie française
1970: Mille ans d’histoire des Tsiganes, Paris, Fayard, series "Les Grandes Études historiques", Prix Broquette-Gonin of the Académie française;  Mil anos de historia de los Gitanos, translation by Domingo Pruna, Barcelona, Plaza et Janes, 1974 ;  Mille anni di storia degli Zigari, translation by Mirella Karpati, Milan, Jaca Book
1981: Les Bohémiens en France au XIXe, J.-C. Lattès, series "Lattès/Histoire, Groupes et Sociétés", Prix Biguet of the Académie française
1983: Le Monde des Tsiganes, Paris, Berger-Levrault
Vaux de Foletier wrote over two hundred articles, reports, bibliographical entries in the journal Études tsiganes and the Journal of the Gipsy Lore Society.

Bibliography 
 Histoires tsiganes — hommage à François de Vaux de Foletier, La Rochelle, Archives départementales de la Charente-Maritime, 15 octobre - 31 décembre 2003

See also 
 Romani people

References

External links 
 JOURDA de VAUX de FOLETIER François on Prosopo.php
 François JOURDA de VAUX de FOLETIER on Geneanet
 59 J Papiers Jourda de Vaux de Foletier

Winners of the Prix Broquette-Gonin (literature)
20th-century French historians
French archivists
École Nationale des Chartes alumni
Chevaliers of the Légion d'honneur
People from Maine-et-Loire
1893 births
1988 deaths